Beryl Bain is a Canadian actress and playwright.

Early life and education 
Bain studied acting at York University, graduating in 2005 with a BFA.

Career 
Bain has participated in several seasons of both the Shaw Festival and the Stratford Festival. In 2023, Bain will debut the work The Flight which explores the life of aviation pioneer Bessie Coleman, the first African American and first Native American to hold an international pilot's license. In addition to appearing in several Canadian-produced television series, Bain has also done voicework for Far Cry 5.

Acting credits

Theatre

Television

References

External links
 Interview with Beryl Bain about her play The Flight

Year of birth missing (living people)
Living people
Canadian stage actresses
Canadian television actresses
Canadian voice actresses
Canadian women dramatists and playwrights
21st-century Canadian dramatists and playwrights
21st-century Canadian actresses
21st-century Canadian women writers